Häpy Endkö? Eli kuinka Uuno Turhapuro sai niin kauniin ja rikkaan vaimon is a Finnish 1977 comedy film written by Spede Pasanen and directed by Ere Kokkonen. It is the fourth film in the Uuno Turhapuro series. Its title translates to "A Happy End? Or how Uuno Turhapuro got such a beautiful and rich wife".

Plot
Uuno moves in flight cargo to Helsinki for the search of a rich, beautiful wife. He buys elegant clothes for eight marks from an estate auction and in two weeks becomes the most pursued bachelor in town, charming all the women. He also starts as a waiter in Vaaleanpunainen sika (Pink Pig), which starts the first quarrels between him and his father-in-law.

External links

1977 films
1970s Finnish-language films
Spede Pasanen
Finnish black-and-white films